Senator Wofford may refer to:

Harris Wofford (1926–2019), U.S. Senator from Pennsylvania from 1991 to 1995
Thomas A. Wofford (1908–1978), U.S. Senator from South Carolina in 1956